The Hozier Islands are a Baffin Island offshore island group located in the Arctic Archipelago in the territory of Nunavut's Qikiqtaaluk Region. The uninhabited island group lies in the Labrador Sea, east of Hall Peninsula.

References 

Archipelagoes of Baffin Island
Uninhabited islands of Qikiqtaaluk Region
Archipelagoes of the Canadian Arctic Archipelago
Islands of the Labrador Sea